Ramsaran is an Indian politician and a member of the Sixteenth Legislative Assembly of Uttar Pradesh in India. He represents the Sri Nagar constituency of Uttar Pradesh and is a member of the Samajwadi Party political party. Ramsaran belongs to the scheduled caste community.

Early life and education
Ramsaran  was born in Lakhimpur Kheri district. He holds Bachelor of Arts degree (alma mater not known).

Political career
Ramsaran  has been a MLA for one term. He represented the Sri Nagar constituency and is a member of the Samajwadi Party political party.

Posts held

See also

 Sixteenth Legislative Assembly of Uttar Pradesh
 Sri Nagar (Assembly constituency)
 Uttar Pradesh Legislative Assembly

References 

Samajwadi Party politicians
Uttar Pradesh MLAs 2012–2017
People from Lakhimpur Kheri district
1963 births
Living people